WSSL-FM (100.5 FM, "Whistle 100.5") is a radio station licensed to Gray Court, South Carolina. Owned by iHeartMedia, it broadcasts a country music format serving Upstate South Carolina. Its studios are in downtown Greenville and its transmitter is in Gray Court. The station also has an auxiliary transmitter next to the main transmitter that operates at 98,000 watts ERP.

WSSL-FM broadcasts in HD Radio. Its HD2 subchannel carries country music from iHeartRadio's "Club Jam Country" channel, which carries rhythmic country songs.

History
The first station at 100.5 FM to be located in the Greenville-Spartanburg market was WDXY-FM, a sister station to WORD (AM) in Spartanburg.

100.5 signed on in November 1960 as WLBG-FM, the FM sister to WLBG 860 AM in Laurens. It became WGXL in the 70s when it moved the tower to Gray Court and increased the power. At the time, well known local broadcast personality Monty Dupuy moved his morning show from WFBC to what was then called XL Stereo 100. Former WFBC-TV news director Dave Partridge also provided news on the station during this time.

WGXL was sold in the early 80s to Keymarket Group, which took the station country in September 1981 as WSSL and moved it into the Greenville-Spartanburg market.

The station is now owned by Clear Channel Communications, along with fellow country station WESC-FM.  Musically, the stations are similar, with WESC playing some more gold/classic country songs.  By the late 2000s, WSSL had emerged as the leading country music station in upstate South Carolina.  The station is home to the popular Ellis & Bradley morning show. Beginning in May 2009, WSSL began airing the syndicated After Midnite With Blair Garner.

External links

SSL-FM
IHeartMedia radio stations